The following is a list of the most populous cities in Maharashtra state of India as per the 2011 census. There are 43 cities in Maharashtra which have a population over 100,000.

List of cities

See also 

 List of districts of Maharashtra
 List of metropolitan areas in India
 List of states and union territories of India by population
 Demographics of India

Weblinks 

 Census 2011

References 

Maharashtra
Population
Maharashtra-related lists